The Edwin Reese House, also known as the Reese-Phillips House, is a historic Greek Revival style house in Eutaw, Alabama, United States.  The house is a two-story wood-frame building on a raised brick foundation. Four monumental Ionic columns span the front portico.  It was built from 1856 to 1859 by Edwin Reese.  The house was recorded by the Historic American Buildings Survey in 1936.  It was listed on the Alabama Register of Landmarks and Heritage on October 17, 1980.  It was added to the National Register of Historic Places as a part of the Antebellum Homes in Eutaw Thematic Resource on April 2, 1982, due to its architectural significance.

References

National Register of Historic Places in Greene County, Alabama
Houses on the National Register of Historic Places in Alabama
Houses completed in 1859
Greek Revival houses in Alabama
Properties on the Alabama Register of Landmarks and Heritage
Houses in Greene County, Alabama